DCB Bank Limited is a private sector scheduled commercial bank in India. It is amongst the new generation banks that received the scheduled commercial bank license from the bank regulator, Reserve Bank of India. DCB Bank received the licence on 31 May 1995.

A professional management team guided by the Board of Directors runs the Bank. DCB Bank’s business segments include Retail, micro-SME, SME, mid-Corporate, Agriculture, Commodities, Government, Public Sector, Indian Banks, Co-operative Banks and Non Banking Finance Companies (NBFC). It has approximately 1,000,000 customers.

The Aga Khan Fund for Economic Development (AKFED) is the promoter of the Bank with around 15% stake. Public shareholding under the Resident Individual category is approximately 39.4%.

History
DCB Bank Limited has 400 branches across India, as on 31st March 2022, and has operations within the India geography.

It is publicly listed in India on the Bombay Stock Exchange and National Stock Exchange respectively. DCB Bank offered shares to the public by an initial public offering (IPO) in 2006.

Historically, DCB Bank's origin from Maharashtra, India was the outcome of the merger between Ismailia Co-operative Bank Limited and the Masalawala Co-operative Bank to form Development Co-operative Bank. This changed to Development Credit Bank upon grant of the scheduled bank license by the Reserve Bank of India in May 1995. DCB Bank Limited is the contemporary identity, registered entity, and corporate logo.

Awards

DCB Bank was the runner-up Best Small Bank in India recognised by Businessworld Magna Awards 2018. It was also rated as the Best Small Bank in India by BusinessWorld Magna Awards 2017. The Bank was conferred the Good Corporate Citizen Award 2017–18 by the Bombay Chamber of Commerce & Industry. This was in recognition of the activities actively promoted by the Bank for sustainability and climate change mitigation across India. DCB Bank has been awarded the "Excellent Services of the Year" award by ASSOCHAM, in the 8th MSMEs Excellence Awards March 2022. It has also won the Best CSR Impact Award in UBS FORUMS 2022 for its work in Banki, Cuttack, Orissa for its Livelihood Improvement Project through Integrated Watershed Management. It has achieved the prestigious Great Place to Work Certification for 2022-2023 which identifies and recognizes Great Workplace Cultures.

See also

 Banking in India
 List of banks in India

References 

  6. https://www.business-standard.com/article/companies/dcb-bank-q1-profit-at-rs-700-million-against-rs-650-million-in-q-fy18-118071400624_1.html Business Standard 14 July 2018

External links

Banks based in Mumbai
Private sector banks in India
Aga Khan Development Network
1995 establishments in Maharashtra
Banks established in 1995
Companies listed on the National Stock Exchange of India
Companies listed on the Bombay Stock Exchange